Geoffrey Brock (born October 19, 1964) is an American poet and translator. Since 2006 he has taught creative writing and literary translation at the University of Arkansas, where he is Distinguished Professor of English.

Biography
Brock is the son of poets Van K. Brock and Frances Brock. Born in Atlanta, he grew up in Tallahassee, Florida, and as an adult he has lived in Philadelphia, Gainesville (Florida), Washington DC, San Francisco, Tucson, Dallas, London, England, and Florence, Italy. He now lives with his wife, the novelist Padma Viswanathan, in Fayetteville, Arkansas. 

He received a Bachelor of Arts degree from Florida State University in 1986 and a Masters of Fine Arts degree from the University of Florida in 1998.  He also holds an MA and a PhD in Comparative Literature from the University of Pennsylvania.

Brock is the author of three books of poetry, the translator of numerous volumes of poetry, prose, and comics, mostly from Italian, and the editor of The FSG Book of Twentieth-Century Italian Poetry, which reviewers called "a beautiful, superbly edited anthology" and "so thoughtfully conceived that the experience of reading [it] feels like the experience of reading an intricate novel." His poems and translations have appeared widely in journals and anthologies, including The New Yorker, Poetry Magazine, The New Republic, Paris Review, Yale Review, PN Review, The New York Times, The New York Review of Books, and Best American Poetry.

Awards
Brock has received numerous honors for both his translations and his own poetry. In 2005, his first book of poems, Weighing Light, won the New Criterion Poetry Prize, judged by David Yezzi, A.E. Stallings, and Charles Martin. In 2014, his second book of poems, Voices Bright Flags, received the Anthony Hecht Prize, judged by Heather McHugh. He has also been the recipient of a National Endowment for the Arts poetry fellowship, a Stegner Fellowship in poetry from Stanford University, and a Cullman Fellowship from the Dorothy and Lewis B. Cullman Center for Scholars and Writers at the New York Public Library. His poems have been included in The Best American Poetry and the Pushcart Prize anthologies.

As a translator, Brock has received a National Endowment for the Arts translation fellowship, two Raiziss/de Palchi Awards from the Academy of American Poets (one for his translation of Cesare Pavese's Disaffections, the other for his translation of Giovanni Pascoli's Last Dream), the Lois Roth Award from the MLA (for his translation of Disaffections), a translation fellowship from the George A. and Eliza Gardner Howard Foundation at Brown University, the John Frederick Nims Memorial Prize for Translation from Poetry Magazine, the Lewis Galantière Award from the American Translators Association (for his translation of Umberto Eco's novel The Mysterious Flame of Queen Loana), a Guggenheim Fellowship, and the National Translation Award for poetry (for his translation of Giuseppe Ungaretti's Allegria) from the American Literary Translators Association.

Books

Poetry

Translations of Poetry

Translations of Prose

Translations of Comics

Anthologies Edited

Selected Online Works

References

External links
Official site
Geoffrey Brock's page at the Poetry Foundation
Featured Interview and Poetry on Able Muse, Reload Issue
University of Arkansas Programs in Creative Writing and Translation
The Academy of American Poets
From the Fishouse
PEN American Center

1964 births
Living people
21st-century American poets
American male poets
Formalist poets
Italian–English translators
Literary translators
The New York Review of Books people
Stanford University alumni
University of Arkansas faculty
University of Florida alumni
University of Pennsylvania alumni
21st-century American translators
Poets from Georgia (U.S. state)
Writers from Atlanta
21st-century American male writers